Nature in Art is a museum and art gallery at Wallsworth Hall, Twigworth, Gloucester, England, dedicated exclusively to art inspired by nature in all forms, styles and media. The museum has twice been specially commended in the National Heritage Museum of the Year Awards.

Trust 

The gallery is operated by the Nature in Art Trust, a registered charity (No: 1000553) set up in 1982 as the "Society for Wildlife Art of the Nations". The trust purchased Wallsworth Hall in 1987. The Trust's patron is Princess Alexandra. Its President, until her death in January 2010, was Lady Philippa Scott, who had succeeded her husband Sir Peter Scott in that role. Its Vice-Presidents are Dr. Heather Angel, Lord Barber of Tewkesbury, Dr. David Bellamy, Sonja Fuchs OBE, Lord Griffiths of Fforestfach, David Gower OBE, David Lank CM, Professor Sir Ghillean Prance, Dr. Shirley Sherwood, and Judge David Turner, QC.

Exhibits 

Among its permanent collection are works by notable nature artists including Eric Ennion, George Edward Lodge, David Shepherd, Archibald Thorburn and Charles Tunnicliffe; as well as more general artists such as Pablo Picasso.

The gallery holds regular exhibitions of loaned works; subjects of those dedicated to the work of a single artist have included Joy Adamson, Peter Scott and David Shepherd. Other visiting exhibitions have included the annual Wildlife Photographer of the Year.

References

Further reading
 Nature in Art, (2008) "A Brief history of Wallsworth Hall". Gloucester:Nature in Art

External links

Selected artworks from the collection, via The Art Fund

Art museums and galleries in Gloucestershire
Museums in Gloucester
Organizations established in 1982
Charities based in Gloucestershire
1982 establishments in England
Art museums established in 1982